Walter Jokisch (1914–1984) was a German stage, radio and television actor.

Filmography

References

Bibliography
 Alexander Schouvaloff & Victor Borovsky. Stravinsky on Stage. Stainer & Bell, 1982.

External links

1914 births
1984 deaths
German male film actors
German male stage actors
German male television actors
Actors from Wrocław